The Ignacy Domeyko Polish Library is the biggest Polish library in South America. Founded in 1960 in Buenos Aires, Argentina and named after the Polish geologist and mineralogist Ignacy Domeyko.

External links 
 Biblioteca Polaca Ignacio Domeyko
 Un sitio Web sobre Ignacio Domeyko

1960 establishments in Argentina
Buildings and structures in Buenos Aires
Culture in Buenos Aires
Education in Buenos Aires
Libraries in Argentina
Polish diaspora organizations
European-Argentine culture in Buenos Aires
Polish-Argentine culture
Libraries established in 1960